Council for the Regulation of Engineering in Nigeria (COREN) formerly known as Council for the Registration of Engineers in Nigeria, is the regulatory body that governs the practice of engineering in Nigeria.

Registration Procedure in private company
Registration is done online and first requires the individual's institution sending the individuals transcript to a specified mail address. This also involves paying some fee and uploading some document to the body's website. COREN membership is required to practice engineering independently, is a requirement for some engineering firms, and is mandatory for government contracts.

Council Structure 
The Council is the highest policy making body. The Members of the Council must be registered Engineering Personnel. The Council consist of 26 members in accordance with the Act, as follows:

 President – elected by the Council
 Six Representatives of the Nigerian Society of Engineers
 Four Representatives of the Universities with Engineering Faculties
 One Representative of the Polytechnics
 One Representative of the Technical Colleges
 Six Representatives from States of the Federation
 Four Representatives of the Minister
 One Representative of NATE
 One Representative of NISET
 One Representative of NAEC

Council Committees 
 Regulation and Control
 Finance and general purpose
 Registration Committee
 Education and training
 Appointment, Promotion and Disciplinary Committee of Council

Other Nigerian Engineering Bodies 
The Nigerian Society of Engineers (NSE)
National Academy of Engineering (NAE)
Association of Consulting Engineers in Nigeria (ACEN)
Association of Professional Women Engineers in Nigeria (APWEN)
Society of Petroleum Engineers (SPE)

References

Engineering societies
Organizations based in Nigeria